Francisco Nuno Fernandes (born 1 April 1969 in Porto, Portugal) is a retired Portuguese athlete who specialised in pole vaulting. He represented Portugal at three consecutive Summer Olympics, starting in 1992, each time failing to qualify for the final.

His personal record was 5.66 metres outdoors and 5.62 metres indoors, both set in 1996. Those marks stood as national records until being broken by Edi Maia in 2013 and 2012 respectively.

Competition record

References

Portuguese male pole vaulters
1969 births
Living people
Olympic athletes of Portugal
Athletes (track and field) at the 1992 Summer Olympics
Athletes (track and field) at the 1996 Summer Olympics
Athletes (track and field) at the 2000 Summer Olympics
Universiade medalists in athletics (track and field)
Sportspeople from Porto
Universiade bronze medalists for Portugal
Medalists at the 1995 Summer Universiade